Softaculous is a commercial script library that automates the installation of commercial and open source web applications to a website. Softaculous scripts are executed from the administration area of a website control panel, typically via an interface tool such as cPanel, Plesk, H-Sphere,  DirectAdmin and InterWorx. Softaculous applications typically create tables in a database, install software, adjust permissions, and modify web server configuration files.

Softaculous targets open-source software and is available in Free and Premium license versions. The free version supports 46 scripts. The Premium version has 436 scripts and 1115 PHP Classes.

See also 
 Installatron – a Softaculous competitor.
 Fantastico (web hosting) – a Softaculous competitor.

Integrated hosting control panels
 cPanel
 DirectAdmin
 Plesk
 Interworx

References

External links 
 

Web hosting